A moniker (also known as a streak, tag, or hobo art) is a piece of graffiti on the side of a freight car on freight trains. Monikers are produced with a solid paint stick, industrial crayon, or a lumber crayon.  Monikers serve the purpose for a moniker artist to share stories or a moment in time with others. Many moniker artists have a unique design they produce, and sometimes write the area they are from, or date that the moniker was produced. Occasionally, a short phrase will accompany monikers (this being started by Bozo Texino, famous for his Colossus of Roads moniker). Many of the artists are railroad workers, train hoppers, and railroad enthusiasts.

References

•Gastman, Roger and Neelon, Caleb. The History of American Graffiti, 2010.

Graffiti and unauthorised signage